Mandaue, officially the City of Mandaue, is a 1st class highly urbanized city in the Central Visayas region of the Philippines. According to the 2020 census, it has a population of 364,116 people.

Mandaue City is located on the central-eastern coastal region of Cebu. Its southeast coast borders Mactan Island where Lapu-Lapu City is located and is connected to the island via two bridges: the Mactan-Mandaue Bridge and Marcelo Fernan Bridge. Mandaue City is bounded on the north by the town of Consolacion, to the east by the Camotes Sea, and to the west and south by Cebu City.

It is one of three highly urbanized cities on Cebu island and forms a part of the Cebu Metropolitan area and was part of the sixth district of Cebu joined with the municipalities of Consolacion and Cordova - it was qualified for a lone district since 1991. In April 5, 2019, President Rodrigo Duterte signed a law declaring this city as a lone legislative district. As of June 30, 2022, Mandaue City had its first representation in the 19th Congress of the Philippines.

History

A community was established in Mandaue by a flourishing group of Austronesian people. The Venetian chronicler Antonio Pigafetta wrote of a settlement called Mandaui which existed in the area with a chieftain named Apanoaan some called him Lambuzzan in other accounts.

Mandaue natives were forced into a town as decreed by the Spanish authorities. This may have started off as a mission village (which included present day Consolacion, Liloan and Poro) serving as a bulwark for the church in the northern Cebu and was managed by the Jesuit in 1638 then a century later by the Recollects.

The Philippine Revolution of 1898 gave the town a new form of administration in accordance with the organic decree of the Central Revolutionary Government. The short-lived revolution was overthrown by the American troops and a battle nearly destroyed the town in 1901, killing Presidente Benito Ceniza.

Mandaue was a semi-autonomous functioning town. Semi-autonomous as it was still under the jurisdiction of Cebu. Despite having been developed and organized by the Spaniards throughout the ages and its population increasing as the years gone by, the Spaniards did not make an initiative to elevate the town into an independent municipality. It was only after the death of Presidente Ceniza and the establishment of American Rule in Mandaue that the dream of becoming an independent municipality came true. In 1901, Mandaue became an independent municipality.

Mandaue became independent from being an American Commonwealth and a Japanese garrison on July 4, 1946, along with the entire nation.

Cityhood

On August 30, 1969, Mandaue became a chartered city and decades later it was recognized as an HUC (Highly urbanized city) on February 15, 1991. In early-April 2019, president Rodrigo Duterte signed a law that declared Mandaue City as a lone legislative district, which means that it will be separated from the sixth district, and will have its own representative of the lone district.

Geography

The city is the 6th smallest government unit in terms of land area; among the Metro Cebu local government units the city is the second smallest next to the municipality of Cordova in the island of Mactan. The city's land area is only 4.5% of the total land area of Metro Cebu and less than 1% of the total land of the province of Cebu.

The North Reclamation Project, now known as the North Special Administrative Zone, currently has about  reclaimed land. Of the 180 hectares, about  belong to the city.

Many of the areas of the city are extremely flat. About 77.37% is within the 0-8% slope category. Barangays belonging to this region are Centro, Looc, South Special Administrative Zone, Cambaro, Opao, Umapad, Paknaan, Alang-alang, Tipolo, Ibabao, Guizo, Subangdaku, Mantuyong, Maguikay and Tabok. The greater portion of the city, comprising about 70%, is dominated by the Mandaue Clay Loam soil series. This is found in the 0-2% and 2-5% slope ranges. Faraon clay loam characterizes the rest of the land with slope range from 5-8% and up to 25-40%.

Climate

Barangays
Mandaue comprises 27 barangays.

Demographics

Data showed that the oldest written accounts of Mandaue came from a population of 160 in 1637 to 1638. During the first year of its township in 1899, Mandaue had 42 barrios with a population of 21,086. When Mandaue was a second class municipality in 1964 its population was 33,811.

Mandaue has a significantly large population at or below the poverty line.

Economy

About 40 percent of Cebu's export companies are found in Mandaue. The city is dubbed as the industrial hub of Region VII and hosts about 10,000 industrial and commercial businesses, making it a "little rich city" in the country. It is home to some of the world's biggest companies such as San Miguel Corp., Coca-Cola Bottling Corp. Shemberg, the number one exporter of carrageenan, Monde Nissin, Profood International Corp., and 7D Dried Mangoes. Mandaue City also accounts for 75 percent of the country's total exports in the furniture sector, making the city the furniture capital of the country. One of these furniture companies is Mandaue Foam which started in 1971 and now has 25 factories and showrooms nationwide.

Tourism 

Mandaue's point of interests, destinations, and attractions include:

Natural areas
 Monkey Caves
 Cansaga Bay
 Butuanon River
 Casili Hills
 Jagobiao Spring
 Cabancalan-Banilad Sinkholes
 Mahiga River
Historical locations
 Bantayan Sa Hari
 National Shrine of Saint Joseph
 Mandaue Presidencia, City Hall
 Ouano Wharf
 Mandaue Salt Beds
 Eversley Childs Sanitarium
 Rizal-Bonifacio Memorial Library
 Bathan Press
 San Miguel Brewery
 Rainbow Lane
 Cebu International Convention Center
Museums
 856 G Gallery
 Luis Cabrera Ancestral House and Museum
 Mandaue City Public Library
 Quijano Museum 

Parks
 City Plaza
 Bridge Park
 Ibabao Mandaue Agri-Eco Park
 Subangdaku Wireless Sports Center
 Cebu Westown Lagoon
WaterWorld Cebu
Sports
 Wireless Plaza and Sports Complex
 Mandaue City Sports and Cultural Complex
 Mandaue Tennis Complex
 Portside Badminton Plaza
 Quick Points Badminton Club
 San Roque Football Club
 Sacred Heart–Ateneo de Cebu Sports Complex
 Cebu Golf Academy
 Gorilla Booth Camp
Shopping
 Ayala Malls Gatewalk Central (under construction)
 Parkmall
 J Centre Mall
 Pacific Mall
 Bridges Town Square
 Insular Square Mall
 City Times Square

Fiestas

Mandaue Fiesta: Celebrated on May 8 in honor of the town patron, St. Joseph. Activities that are typically held during this feast are the procession, inter-barangay sports competition, Miss Mandaue (the longest-running beauty competition in the province), rodeos, street festival (Mantawi Festival), bailes, fairs, and many more.

Panagtagbo sa Mandaue: This is Mandaue's current major festival in honor of the Holy Family. This is celebrated every 2nd week of January on the eve of the Traslacion (Transfer of Relic), of one of the significant religious events of the Sinulog Festival which commemorates the union of the Holy Family. In the Translacion, the Santo Niño and the Virgin of Guadalupe come and stay over at the shrine of Saint Joseph in Mandaue for an overnight vigil. This happens on a Friday, and on the early morning of the following Saturday, a fluvial procession is held on Cebu Strait going back to the Basilica . In the festival, there are singing and dancing competitions with a street dancing during the Bibingkahan in honor of Santo Niño. At night, there is a ritual showdown performance which is the highlight of the cultural-religious events.

Kabayo Festival:
The Kabayo (Horse) festival also known as Governor's Cup is a horse racing and different equestrian sports with the western way of riding event held annually in the second week of February.

Pasigarbo sa Sugbo:
It is a festival showcasing Cebu's culture, faith, history, products, and festivals from each individual town. It is held annually around August 6 which is the Charter day of the Province of Cebu. It was formerly held in Mandaue City at the Cebu International Convention Center (CICC), but was transferred to the Cebu City Sports Complex in Cebu City in 2019 due to the abandoned and disrepaired state of the convention center.

Cuisine

Mandaue has many restaurants which cater to gourmets and international cuisines like Italian, Japanese, Indian, Mediterranean, Lebanese, Arabic, Russian, Korean, Mexican, and Western cuisines. A variety of restaurants also serves meals of local cuisine.

Many famous Cebuano meals like the lechon  or inasal, eaten with achara or pickled vegetables. The sugba or barbecue of either isda (fish), baboy (pork), manok (chicken) or baka (beef) is found all over Mandaue eaten with puso, a diamond-shaped hanged rice covered in coco leaves. Kinilaw is raw meat usually pork or fish drenched in vinegar and salt. The buwad or dried seafood, either fish or squid, can be pungent with a crunchy and chewy texture. There are some exotic meals that can be found like dinuguan or pig's blood which is eaten like a soup. Barbecued chicken feet are liked by many locals.

Original cuisine in Mandaue includes bibingka which is steamed rice cakes mixed with coconut and sometimes egg. Binangos paired with rice is made of ground up corn with Bolinao fish.  This dish is found only in Mandaue; other delicacies includes the tagaktak, the seasonal buriring fish (stewed with iba) and the famous masareal.

Transportation

Mandaue City's road network is composed of a national highway which connects the city to its neighboring cities and municipalities, and a national secondary road which traverses the city's metropolitan area.
 National road   - 
 City road       - 
 Barangay road   - 

Land transportation is being served by PUJ, utility vehicles, mini-buses, multi-cabs, tricycles, trisikads and for cargoes, trailers and vans. Sea transport of Mandaue is highly dependent on Port of Cebu and Cebu International Port, because of the city's proximity to these facilities.

Education

Mandaue houses two universities, the Cebu Doctors' University and the Lapu-Lapu–Mandaue campus of the University of Cebu. There are also technical schools like TESDA in barangays Banilad and Looc and other private institutions that provide certificate degrees. Associate degree, Baccalaureate Degrees, Master's and Doctoral programs.

Mandaue has institutionalized learning with the Cabahug Medal which was started on 1923 by Sotero Cabahug as a medal of academic excellence annually. The Mandaue Fraternal Society was also created in the early part of the 19th century to provide a community for the professionals during the time when Mandaue was still a sleepy town.

Cebu's part-time Japanese school, the Cebu Japanese School (CJS; セブ補習授業校 Sebu Hoshū Jugyō Kō), is located on the fifth floor of the Clotilde Commercial Center in Barangay Casuntingan, Mandaue City.

Media

Television
Television stations based in Mandaue City:

DYCB-TV (ABS-CBN Cebu) - Channel 3; a television station of the ABS-CBN's regional network division, ABS-CBN Regional, currently off-air due to the cease and desist order issued by the National Telecommunications Commission after its legislative franchise lapsed.
DYKC-TV (CNN Philippines) - Channel 9; a relay television station of the Radio Philippines Network / Nine Media Corporation.

Radio
Radio stations licensed in Mandaue City:

DYKC-AM (Radyo Ronda) - 675 kHz; an AM station owned by the Radio Philippines Network / Nine Media Corporation, affiliate of CNN Philippines.
DYAR-AM (Sonshine Radio) - 765 kHz; an AM station owned by Swara Sug Media Corporation and operated by Sonshine Media Network International.
DYAB-AM (Radyo Patrol) 1512 kHz; an AM station owned by ABS-CBN Corporation, currently off-air due to the cease and desist order issued by the National Telecommunications Commission after its legislative franchise lapsed.
DYPC-FM - 88.7 MHz; a community FM station owned by the Mandaue Broadcasting Center, an affiliate member of Vimcontu Broadcasting Corporation's radio station DYLA-AM in Cebu City.
DYLS-FM (MOR Philippines) - 97.1 MHz; a commercial FM station owned by ABS-CBN Corporation, currently off-air due to the cease and desist order issued by the National Telecommunications Commission after its legislative franchise lapsed.

Sister cities

Local

 Bacolod
 Baguio
 Butuan
 Dumaguete
 Iloilo City
 Marikina

International
  Bacău, Romania
  Mosul, Iraq

References

Sources

External links

 [ Philippine Standard Geographic Code]

 
Cities in Cebu
Highly urbanized cities in the Philippines
Populated places established in 1599
1599 establishments in the Philippines
Populated coastal places in the Philippines
Cities in Metro Cebu